Didaphne is a monotypic moth genus in the subfamily Arctiinae erected by Carlos Berg in 1899. Its only species, Didaphne cyanomela, was described by Berthold Neumoegen in 1894. It is found on Cuba.

References

External links

Arctiinae
Moths described in 1894
Monotypic moth genera
Endemic fauna of Cuba